Little Prairie Township is an inactive township in Pemiscot County, in the U.S. state of Missouri.

Little Prairie Township derives its name from a translation of the French La Petite Prairie.

References

Townships in Missouri
Townships in Pemiscot County, Missouri